The Independent Labour Party was a socialist political party in Britain.

Independent Labour Party may also refer to:

 Scottish Trades Councils Independent Labour Party, a forerunner of the British ILP
 Independent Labor Party, a party in Burundi
 Independent Labour Party (India), a former party in India during British colonial rule
 Independent Labour Party (Jamaica)
 Independent Labour Group, a former party in Northern Ireland
 Independent Labour Party, several parties which have existed in Canada—see Labour candidates and parties in Canada—including:
Independent Labour Party (Manitoba, 1895)
Independent Labour Party (Manitoba, 1920)
 Transvaal Independent Labour Party, a former party in the Transvaal Colony

See also
 Labour Independent Group, a British group in the 1940s